The Darrynane Beg Ogham Stone is an ogham stone (CIIC 220) and a National Monument located in County Kerry, Ireland.

Location

The stone originally lay recumbent on Derrynane strand. The Office of Public Works erected it by the roadside in the 1940s.

History

This stone was erected as a grave marker, with inscription in Primitive Irish, some time in the early 6th century AD.

Description
The stone is sandstone grit, . The inscription, heavily weathered, reads ANM ḶḶATỊG̣[NI] Ṃ[A]Q [MINE]ṚC/ Ṃ[UCOI Q  ̣  ̣ ?   ̣  ̣CI?] ("name of Llatigni, son of Minerc, of the tribe of Q...ci") "Llatigni" contains the diminutive particle -gno-, suggesting the name Láithbe or Láithech. Min- is also a diminutive particle, suggesting "Little Erc" (Erc Becc).

References

National Monuments in County Kerry
Ogham inscriptions
6th-century inscriptions
Buildings and structures completed in the 6th century